Battle of Buwaib was fought between the Sassanid Empire and the Rashidun Caliphate soon after the Battle of the Bridge.

Prelude
Battle of the Bridge was a decisive Sasanian victory which gave them a huge boost to expel invading Arabs from Mesopotamia. Thus, they advanced with a huge army to fight the remnants of the Muslim army near Kufa on the Euphrates.

Caliph Umar sent reinforcements to the region which were mainly the people who were fighting Muslims during the Ridda wars.

Battle
Al-Muthanna ibn Haritha managed to force the upcoming Persian army to cross the river to a place where his soldiers, who were divided into Brigades, could encircle their numerically superior opponents.

The war ended with a huge success for the Muslims, thanks in no small part to the help of local Christian Arab tribes who decided to help the Muslim army. According to Tabari, the Persian leader Mihran bin Badhan was killed by a slave, Jabir bin Abdullah, who belonged to the Taghlan tribe. Two masters, Jarir and Ibn Hober (later, a dispute ensued between the masters regarding the sharing of Mehran's weapons and clothings which had to be resolved by Al-Muthanna). The Arabs gained the momentum to further expand their wars against the Sassanids and their allies.

References

Battles involving the Sasanian Empire
Battles involving the Rashidun Caliphate
Muslim conquest of Mesopotamia
Military history of Iraq
634